William Pury, (by 1489–1537 or later), of New Windsor, Berkshire, was an English Member of Parliament.

He was a Member (MP) of the Parliament of England for New Windsor in 1523. He was Mayor of Windsor from 1518–19, and 1522–3.

References

15th-century births
16th-century deaths
16th-century English people
People from Windsor, Berkshire
Members of the Parliament of England (pre-1707)